Anna Creek may refer to:

Anna Creek Station, a homestead in Australia
Anna Creek (Montana), a stream in Montana